JuJu Chan Szeto (born Juliana Chan; 2 February) also known as JuJu Chan, is a Hong Kong-born American actress, martial artist, singer, and writer.

Chan pursued martial arts at a young age, an interest she kept up with into adulthood. She started modeling when she was a teenager, and entered the film industry after receiving her master's degree from NYU Tisch School of the Arts. Chan received wider recognition as Silver Dart Shi in Netflix's Crouching Tiger, Hidden Dragon: Sword of Destiny (2016). She later returned to Netflix as Zan in Wu Assassins (2019). Her fans sometime refer to her as the "female Bruce Lee".

Early life and education 
Chan was born in Hong Kong. At the age of three, she moved to the United States and settled in San Francisco.

She began to learn martial arts at the age of 10. She first started in judo, as that was the closest school at the time, and went on to learn Shotokan karate, wushu, Hung Ga, Wing Chun, ITF Taekwondo, nunchaku, and muay Thai.

Chan graduated cum laude from the University of San Francisco in 2005 with a bachelor's degree in Computer Science and a minor in mathematics and dance. She gained a master's degree from NYU Tisch School of the Arts in 2007.

Entertainment career 
In August 2009, Chan participated in the RTHK reality series Rich Mate Poor Mate, where four participants from wealthy backgrounds experience the lives of the not so fortunate. During the 120-hour experience, Chan (nicknamed "The Beauty Queen") has to live the life of a single immigrant mother in Hong Kong while taking care of her eight-year-old boy.

Chan starred as the title character in the 2009 web series Lumina, written and directed by Jennifer Thym. She has one of the lead roles, Ping Wei, the head concubine, in the thriller Palace of the Damned (previously named The Living Dead) in 2012. Chan also played the lead actress, Pixie Ho, in an Australian-Chinese Production, Hit Girls, an action comedy short film.

Chan starred as Silver Dart Shi in Crouching Tiger, Hidden Dragon: Sword of Destiny directed by Yuen Woo Ping. Chan was the lead actress in Savage Dog released in July 2017.

In August 2018, it was announced that Chan was cast as a recurring character on the Netflix series, Wu Assassins (2019). She played Triad lieutenant Zan Hui. It was announced in February 2021 that she would reprise her role in the sequel film, Fistful of Vengeance. It was later released on 17 February 2022.

In June 2019, Chan joined Dimitri Logothetis's martial arts thriller Jiu Jitsu (2020).

Martial arts career 
In 2013 she represented Hong Kong in the Taekwon-Do (ITF) World Championship in Bulgaria.

Pageant career 
In July 2009, she participated in the United Nations Pageants International in Jamaica, where she won Miss Congeniality and Miss United Nation International Ambassador.

Music

Discography 
I Wanna Hold Your Heart (2011)

Release date: 5 December 2011Songs：
那些年的我們
好勝
瞬間救地球
I Wanna Hold Your Heart

Music awards 
2011 – Hong Kong Metro Radio New Singer Award (2011年度新城勁爆頒獎禮 – 新城勁爆新登場海外歌手)
2011 – Hong Kong uChannel Teens most favorite new singer Award (2011uChannel我撐起樂壇頒獎禮 – 我最喜愛女新人獎)

Other work 
In 2010, Chan became the spokesperson and ambassador of Heroes2, a charity organization which focuses on reforestation throughout the areas of rural China.

Chan has also written her first semi-autobiography To Live a Beautiful Life, releasing it in June 2010.

Personal life 
She has a twin sister. On 1 October 2019, Chan married frequent collaborator Antony Szeto in Los Angeles.

Filmography

Television

Bibliography

Notes

References

External links
JuJu Chan Szeto on Instagram
JuJu Chan Szeto on Twitter
JuJu Chan Szeto on Facebook

Living people
20th-century American women writers
21st-century American actresses
21st-century American women singers
21st-century American singers
Actresses from the San Francisco Bay Area
American actresses of Chinese descent
American film actresses
American female taekwondo practitioners
American Muay Thai practitioners
American Wing Chun practitioners
American female judoka
American female karateka
American Hung Gar practitioners
American wushu practitioners
American television actresses
American female models
Chinese Hung Gar practitioners
Female models from California
Female Muay Thai practitioners
Hong Kong emigrants to the United States
Hong Kong female models
21st-century Hong Kong women singers
Hong Kong film actresses
Hong Kong female martial artists
Hong Kong female taekwondo practitioners
Hong Kong Muay Thai practitioners
Hong Kong kung fu practitioners
Hong Kong female judoka
Hong Kong female karateka
Hong Kong television actresses
Hong Kong women writers
Hong Kong writers
Musicians from the San Francisco Bay Area
Tisch School of the Arts alumni
University of San Francisco alumni
Writers from the San Francisco Bay Area
Wing Chun practitioners from Hong Kong
Year of birth missing (living people)